The Claire Trevor School of the Arts (CTSA, Claire Trevor) is an academic unit at the University of California, Irvine, focused on the performing and visual arts. The four departments housed in the school are for art, dance, drama, and music. CTSA has undergraduate programs, masters programs, and a doctoral program in drama conducted jointly with UC San Diego.

Architecture and history
The school was named in honor of Academy Award-winning Hollywood actress Claire Trevor (1910–2000), a longtime resident of nearby Newport Beach and the stepmother of UCI benefactor Donald Bren. The school represents the largest contribution to the campus by architect William Pereira, who oversaw its construction in 1970. It features a distinctive "modular" design in which individual buildings are connected by an overhead network of pillar-supported canopies. Early architectural sketches showed a design incorporating a lattice of broadly curved columns around the buildings, this was ultimately simplified into the flared solid forms of the buildings themselves. In 2005, the school's landscape was redesigned by Maya Lin in a retro-futuristic style, featuring an outdoor theater, fountains, decorative LED lighting and landscaping with native grasses and wildflowers.  In fall 2011, the new "green" Contemporary Arts Center opened in the heart of the school, a $42.35-million building equipped with studios and spaces for displaying, staging, and producing art.  It serves as the new anchor for the art school complex.

Departments and faculty

Art department
Founded under the name Studio Art, the department renamed itself in 2012. It teaches a wide range of contemporary media, including drawing, electronic art and design, new genres, painting, performance, photography, sculpture, and video and digital filmmaking. The department has around 20 full-time faculty members and accepts about 10 graduate students each year into its three-year M.F.A. program.

Dance department
The UCI Dance department teaches ballet, modern dance, improvisation, and jazz performance and choreography, as well as courses in the history of dance, dance medicine and science, and the integration of dance with interactive technologies such as motion capture and telematics.

Drama department
Robert Cohen organized an undergraduate repertory company that took Oedipus Rex on the road to UC San Diego and UC Santa Cruz in the department's early years. Other early productions included The Assassination of Jean Paul Marat by the Marquis de Sade, "Little Mary Sunshine", Night of the Iguana and Midsummer Night's Dream. William Inge, author of such plays as Bus Stop, Picnic,  and The Dark at the Top of the Stairs taught playwriting in the drama department in the 1970s.  Jerzy Grotowski, acting theorist and founder of the Polish Laboratory Theater, joined the drama faculty in 1983,  and conducted his Objective Drama project in the fields and barn south of the main campus.  UCI graduate drama student James Slowiak was his chief assistant during the project years.

Music department
The Music department offers both a B.A. and a B.Mus at the undergraduate level, as well as a two-year M.F.A. degree program. Emphases at the Master's level include choral conducting,
collaborative piano, guitar/lute performance, instrumental and piano performance, and vocal arts. There is also a Ph.D. degree in Integrated Composition, Improvisation, and Technology (ICIT) and Musicology.

Notable alumni
Chris Burden, American sculptor and conceptual performance artist known for his self-mutilations, including Shoot, performed while a student, in which an assistant shot him in the arm
Barbara T. Smith, American artist known for her performance work in the late 1960s
Glenn Kaino, American conceptual artist based in Los Angeles
Allison Case, American actor known for her part in the "Tribe" in the Broadway revival of Hair, following her appearance in Keith Fowler's staging of Hair in the Claire Trevor Theater
 caryn morse desai, MFA alumna director, artistic director of the International City Theater, Long Beach, California
Crista Flanagan, a regular on Mad TV, a recipient of an MFA degree from the Claire Trevor School
Bob Gunton, Drama Desk Award-winning actor on stage and screen
Jon Lovitz, American comedian and actor
Kevin Kwan Loucks, CEO of Chamber Music America; co-founder of Chamber Music OC; member of classical music ensemble Trio Céleste
Beth Malone, American Tony Award-nominated stage actress, a performer at the Public Theater, New York, and the Sundance Theater Lab in Utah
Amanda McRaven, MFA alumna director, Winner of Ovation award as "Best Director," 2014
 Teresa K. Pond, MFA alumna director, artistic director of Cyrano Theater Company, Anchorage, Alaska
Andrew Samonsky, American actor known for his role as Lt. Cable in the 2008 Broadway revival of South Pacific
Brian Thompson, American actor, known for his work in action films and TV series
Teal Wicks, American stage actor, known for her role as Elphaba in the Broadway and touring productions of Wicked.  Teal was Sheila in the 2003 version of Hair on the Claire Trevor stage.

References

Links

University of California, Irvine
Art schools in California
Drama schools in the United States
Dance schools in the United States
Music schools in California
Performing arts in California
Performing arts education in the United States
School buildings completed in 1970
Theatres completed in 1970
1970 establishments in California
William Pereira buildings
Modernist architecture in California
University subdivisions in California
Brutalist architecture in California